Redmond may be a surname or given name, and can refer to the following people:

Surnames
Aaron Redmond, New Zealand cricketer
Alex Redmond, American football player
Bridget Redmond, Irish politician, widow of Wiliam Archer Redmond
Carol K. Redmond, American biostatistician
Derek Redmond (born 1965), British athlete
Dick Redmond, former NHL defenseman
Elsa Redmond, American archaeologist
Granville Redmond, was a deaf American landscape painter and actor in silent films
Harriet Redmond (c.1862–1952), African-American suffragist
Harry Redmond (baseball) (1887–1960), baseball player with the Brooklyn Superbas
Harry Redmond (footballer) (1933–1985), English-born footballer who played for Millwall
Hugh Francis Redmond, American CIA operative
Ian Redmond, British tropical field biologist and conservationist
Isobel Redmond, South Australian MP, Liberal leader and Leader of the Opposition
James Redmond (broadcaster), British television executive with the BBC
James Redmond (actor), British actor
Jimmy Redmond (born 1977), American football player
John Edward Redmond, Irish politician, great-uncle to John Redmond
John Redmond, Irish politician
Layne Redmond, American musician
Liam Redmond, Irish actor
Marge Redmond, American actress
Martin Redmond, British politician
Michael Redmond, Canadian politician
Michael Redmond, Irish comedian and actor
Michael Redmond, American Go player
Mickey Redmond, former hockey player and sports announcer
Mike Redmond, professional baseball player
Phil Redmond, British writer and producer
Sarah-Jane Redmond, Canadian actress born in Cyprus, Greece
Siobhan Redmond, British actor
Sophie Redmond, Surinamese physician and activist
William Archer Redmond, Irish politician, father of John Redmond
William Redmond, Irish politician, son of John Redmond
Willie Redmond, Irish politician and soldier, brother of John Redmond
Nathan Redmond, English professional footballer who plays for Beşiktaş

First name
Redmond Barry (1813–1880), British colonial judge in Victoria, Australia
Redmond "Red" Gerard, American snowboarder
Redmond O'Hanlon, British travel writer
Redmond "Red" Symons, English born Australian musician, television, and radio personality
 Redmond Boyle Character from Command and Conquer 3

 Redmond Mann, character from Team Fortress 2

See also
Redmond (disambiguation)

Surnames of Irish origin
Anglicised Irish-language surnames